Sinopoli is a comune (municipality) in the Province of Reggio Calabria in the Italian region Calabria, located about 90 km southwest of Catanzaro and about 30 km northeast of Reggio Calabria. As of 31 December 2004, it had a population of 2,303 and an area of 25.8 km².

The municipality of Sinopoli contains the frazioni (subdivisions, mainly villages and hamlets) Sinopoli inferiore and Sinopoli vecchio.

Sinopoli borders the following municipalities: Cosoleto, Oppido Mamertina, Roccaforte del Greco, Roghudi, San Procopio, Sant'Eufemia d'Aspromonte, Scilla.

Demographic evolution

See also
Giuseppe Sinopoli, an Italian conductor and composer

References

Cities and towns in Calabria